Subhapradam is a 2010 Indian Telugu-language Drama film directed by veteran director K. Viswanath it was his last time in his lifetime before his death in 2023, starring Allari Naresh and Manjari Phadnis.

Plot
Indu (Manjari Phadnis) is a music loving girl. Her mother is a Malayali and father (Vizag Prasad) Telugu.  She has two younger paternal uncles (Ashok Kumar and Gundu Sudharshan) whose wives are from Chennai and Kolkata respectively. Thus entire India lives in her family. She is good at speaking Telugu, Malayalam, Bengali and Tamil. She happens to see Chakri (Allari Naresh), accidentally who is a good singer but not a professional one. Chakri falls in her love and the response from other side also comes good. But Chakri has a peculiar profession that gets revealed amidst the movie. That is carrying the old and disabled on his back for climbing the hill which is the abode of a goddess.
 
But eventually, Indu happens to encounter a rich man (Sharath Babu) that turns her life. The major twist in the story appears there. Who is that rich man? The story goes like this. He had a grand daughter by name Sindhu who looks perfectly like Indu. Sindhu dies in an acid attack followed by ragging and hence when he sees the look-alike of his grand daughter in Indu, he follows her. What happens later becomes rest of the movie.

Cast
 Allari Naresh as Chakri
 Manjari Phadnis as Indu / Sindhu
 Sharath Babu as Sindhu's grandfather
 Vizag Prasad as Indu's father
 Giri Babu
 Raghu Babu
 Rallapalli
 Jenny
 Ashok Kumar
 Gundu Sudharshan
 Vamsee Chaganti
 Devadas Kanakala

Soundtrack

The audio of Subhapradam was released on 20 June 2010. Chief Minister K Rosaiah unveiled the CDs and handed over to SP Balasubramanyam. The film has music scored by Mani Sharma.

Box office
The film failed to do well at the box office.

References

http://www.cinegoer.com/telugu-cinema/sunitas-reviews/subhapradam-movie-review-160710.html

External links

2010 films
Films directed by K. Viswanath
Films scored by Mani Sharma
2010s Telugu-language films
Films set in Andhra Pradesh
Films shot in Andhra Pradesh
2010 drama films
Indian drama films